Seti Zone was one of the fourteen zones of Nepal, comprising five districts, namely, Achham, Bajhang, Bajura, Doti and Kailali. All these districts are now part of the province known as Sudurpashchim Province. Here are district wise lists of Monuments which were in the Seti Zone.

Seti Zone
 List of monuments in Achham District
 List of monuments in Bajhang District
 List of monuments in Bajura District
 List of monuments in Doti District
 List of monuments in Kailali District

References

See also

Seti Zone
Seti Zone
Sudurpashchim Province